Petrus de Canaberiis (fl. 1280) was a French knight. He served as ambassador of Philip IV of France in Norway.

Biography 
Petrus Canaberiis was possibly born in Paris, he was sent to Norway along with other knights, by Philip the Fair, to carry out a diplomatic mission, concerning reaching an agreement between France and Norway. They were received by Audun Hugleiksson.

In 1280, Petrus Canaberiis participated in the "tournoi du Hem", a chivalric festivity in France, event attended by knights of Normandy, Flanders, and England.

References 

13th-century French people
14th-century French people
Diplomats from Paris
Ambassadors of France to Norway
Politicians from Île-de-France